Fuseini Dauda is a retired Ghanaian-Canadian association football player who played professionally in the USL A-League.

In 1995, Dauda played for the Hamilton White Eagles FC in the Canadian National Soccer League. In 1996, he moved south to the Rochester Rhinos of the USISL A-League, playing three seasons with the Rhinos.  In the fall of 1996, he began his indoor career with the Buffalo Blizzard of the National Professional Soccer League.  Dauda moved to the Detroit Rockers for the 1997-1998 NPSL season.  In 1998, he signed with Sportkring Sint-Niklaas of the Belgian Second Division.  He returned to the Rhinos for the 2001 A-League season.  This season, Rochester won the league title.  He spent 2004 with the Vancouver Whitecaps.  In 2005, he played for the Hamilton Thunder in the Canadian Professional Soccer League.

References

Living people
1975 births
Footballers from Accra
Challenger Pro League players
Buffalo Blizzard players
Canadian soccer players
Canadian expatriate soccer players
Canadian Soccer League (1998–present) players
Detroit Rockers players
Expatriate footballers in Belgium
Hamilton Thunder players
National Professional Soccer League (1984–2001) players
Rochester New York FC players
A-League (1995–2004) players
Vancouver Whitecaps (1986–2010) players
Canadian National Soccer League players
Sportkring Sint-Niklaas players
Association football defenders